Milton Eugene Davis (May 31, 1929 – September 29, 2008) was a defensive back who played four seasons in the National Football League (NFL) for the Baltimore Colts. He had 27 career interceptions with the Colts, and he led the NFL in interceptions in 1957 and 1959.

The   defensive back was born May 31, 1929, on the Fort Gibson Indian reservation in Muskogee, Oklahoma to a father of African American and Native American ancestry. He moved as a toddler to Los Angeles

He attended Jefferson High School and Los Angeles City College, both in Los Angeles.  He worked at the Vista Del Mar Jewish orphanage as a counselor while attending college.  His track performance earned him a partial scholarship at the University of California, Los Angeles. He earned a spot on the UCLA Bruins football team in both 1952 and 1953 under coach Red Sanders, and played in the team's 1954 Rose Bowl 28–20 loss to the Michigan State Spartans.

The Detroit Lions drafted him in 1954, the same year he was drafted into the United States Army, serving there for two years. After his return from the Army, the Lions told him "We don't have a black teammate for you to go on road trips, therefore you can't stay on our team."

The Baltimore Colts gave Davis a tryout and signed him as a free agent. In his rookie season in 1957, he had 10 interceptions which were returned for a total of 219 yards, two of them for touchdowns including a return of 75 yards.  He was on the Associated Press NFL All-Pro Team that season.

In the 1958 season, he had four interceptions, which he returned for a total of 40 yards. In the 1958 NFL Championship Game against the New York Giants, played at Yankee Stadium, Davis — despite playing with two broken bones in his right foot — forced one of two first-half fumbles by Giants running back Frank Gifford, both of which led to touchdowns by the Colts; The Colts won 23–17 in overtime in a game called "The Greatest Game Ever Played".

Davis had seven interceptions in the 1959 season, which he returned for 119 yards, including a 57-yard return for a touchdown. In the 1959 NFL Championship Game, the Colts beat the Giants for a second consecutive season, this time by a 31–16 score. In 1960, he had six interceptions which he returned for 32 yards.

Angered at the treatment of black players, including segregated hotels and restaurants, Davis retired after four seasons in the NFL and returned to complete work on a doctorate in education at UCLA. He worked as a scout for several NFL teams and taught at John Marshall High School. He was a professor of natural history at Los Angeles City College from 1964 to 1989, then retired to Oregon with his wife, where he raised cattle, llama and sheep. He died in Elmira, Oregon of brain cancer at age 79 on September 29, 2008.

References

External links
 "Colts grew with 'Pops' at their side," The Baltimore Sun, Thursday, October 2, 2008.

1929 births
2008 deaths
American football defensive backs
UCLA Bruins football players
Baltimore Colts players
Deaths from brain cancer in the United States
Los Angeles City Cubs football players
University of California, Los Angeles alumni
American people of Native American descent
Sportspeople from Muskogee, Oklahoma
Native American players of American football
Players of American football from Los Angeles
African-American players of American football
Burials at Willamette National Cemetery
Jefferson High School (Los Angeles) alumni
United States Army soldiers
20th-century African-American sportspeople
21st-century African-American people